Joseph Robinson may refer to:

Joseph Robinson (loyalist) (c. 1742–1807), judge and politician in Prince Edward Island
Joseph Robinson (composer) (1815–1898), Irish composer, conductor, and teacher
Joseph Robinson (Australian politician) (c. 1815–1848), Australian politician
Joseph Robinson (oboist) (born 1940), American oboist
Sir Joseph Robinson, 1st Baronet (1840–1929), South African mining magnate
Joseph Armitage Robinson (1858–1933), Dean of Westminster and Wells
Joseph Taylor Robinson (1872–1937), Democratic United States politician who served as a United States senator and congressman from Arkansas
Joseph R. Robinson (1939–2006), American pharmacy academic
Joseph Robinson (priest) (1927–1999), Anglican priest, Canon of Canterbury and Master of the Temple 
Juice Robinson (Joseph Robinson, born 1989), American professional wrestler

See also
Joe Robinson (disambiguation)